Herb is a surname. Notable people with the surname include:

Charles A. Herb (1844-1895), American politician and businessman
Jon Herb (born 1970), American race car driver 
Michael Herb (born 1966), American political scientist
Raymond Herb (1908–1996), American nuclear physicist

See also
Herb (given name)